This is a list of Croatian television related events from 2008.

Events
21 March - Danijela Dvornik is voted winner of Celebrity Big Brother.
29 September - Nova TV joined forces with TV In from Montenegro, FTV/RTRS from Bosnia and Herzegovina, A1 TV from Macedonia and B92 from Serbia to co-produce Operacija trijumf.
19 December - Krešimir Duvančić wins the fifth season of Big Brother.
20 December - The 2003 Mister Croatia Mario Valentić and his partner Ana Herceg win the third season of Ples sa zvijezdama.

Debuts
29 September - Operacija trijumf (2008-2009)

Television shows

2000s
Ples sa zvijezdama (2006-2013)

Ending this year
Big Brother (2004-2008, 2016–present)
Zabranjena ljubav (2004-2008)

Births

Deaths